The British Indian Army Lushai Expedition of 1871 to 1872 was a punitive incursion under the command of Generals Brownlow and Bourchier. The objectives of the expedition were to rescue British subjects who had been captured by the Lushais in raids into Assam—including a six-year-old girl called  Mary Winchester—and to convince the hill tribes of the region that they had nothing to gain and everything to lose by placing themselves in a hostile position towards the British Government.

For the British, the expedition was a success: the prisoners were freed and the hill tribes agreed to negotiated peace terms. The border region was to remain peaceful until 1888 when large scaled raiding was resumed and another punitive expedition was organised.

Prelude
After turning the Burmese out of Assam during the First Anglo-Burmese War in 1824, the Bengal Government of the East India Company attempted to administer all that was not absolutely necessary for the control of the frontier through Purandar Singha a native prince; this arrangement failed, and Assam became a non-regulation province in 1838. On its southern borders lay the Lushais, the principal tribes known to Assam being Thadoe and Poitoo Kukies. For many years, long before the British occupation, the inhabitants of the plains to the south had lived in dread of the Kukies, who used to come down and attack the villages, massacring the inhabitants, taking their heads, and plundering and burning their houses.

The first Kuki or Lushai raid mentioned as being committed in British governed Assam was in 1826. From that year to 1850 the local officers were unable to restrain the fierce attacks of the hillmen on the south. Raids and outrages were of yearly occurrence, and on one occasion the Magistrate of Sylhet reported a series of massacres by "Kookies" in what was alleged to be British territory, in which 150 persons had been killed.

 In 1849 the Kuki attacks were so savage and numerous that Colonel Lister, then Commandant of the Sylhet Light Infantry and Agent for the Khasia Hills, was sent in the cold weather of 1849–1850 to punish the tribes. Mulla contained 800 houses and which he surprised and destroyed without opposition, all the male inhabitants being absent on a marauding excursion. The expedition also did manage to free about 400 captives, but Lister was of the opinion that "this robber tribe will not cease to infest the frontier until they shall be most servilely dealt with". This expedition, however, had the effect of keeping the British Assam southern border tolerably free from disturbance up to the beginning of 1862, when raiding recommenced.

In the cold weather of 1868–1869 the Lushais burnt a tea garden in Cachar and attacked Monierkhal, and an expedition was organized to follow the marauders, to punish the tribes concerned, and to recover the captives. This expedition was in command of Colonel James Nuttall and consisted of three columns,
 but the monsoon rains coming on, the want of provisions and lateness of the season caused the expedition to fail in its principal objects. No tribes were punished and no captives were recovered.

The next season Mr. Edgar, the Deputy Commissioner of Cachar, accompanied by Major MacDonald of the Survey Department and a police escort, made strenuous efforts to get into touch with the Lushais. Accompanied by a small escort he visited them across the border and left nothing undone to conciliate and make friends with them; his good intentions and friendly attitude, however, met with little success, for 1870-1871 saw a series of Lushai raids on a more extensively organized scale and of a more determined character than any previous incursions of the kind.

The first raid occurred in the Chittagong Hill Tracts on 31 December 1870, a little more than a day's journey from the Chima outpost. The raiding were about 200 strong. On 23 January 1871 the village of Ainerkhal, on the extreme west of the Cachar district, was burnt, 25 persons killed, and 37 taken prisoners. The same day the tea garden of Alexandrapore was destroyed by a party of the "How long" tribe under "Sanpoong" and "Benkuia", Mr. Winchester, a tea planter, being killed, and his child Mary, a girl of six years, carried off. The rescue of this kidnapped little British girl became a major factor in the expedition that was to follow.

A few hours after the attack on Winchester tea garden (plantation), the adjoining garden of Kutlicherra was attacked, but the Lushais raiders were driven off by two planters. The following day a second attack was made on Kutlicherra, when two Lushais were wounded.

On 26 January the raiders surprised some sepoys and police in the Monierkhal garden, killed one sepoy, and wounded one sepoy and one policeman, and commenced an attack on the stockade and coolie lines. Reinforcements arriving they retired with a loss of 57 men killed and wounded. British loss being six killed and six wounded and one coolie missing. Simultaneously with the attack on Monierkhal a party raided the adjoining garden of Dhurmikhal, but did little damage.

Emboldened by their successes the raiders penetrated as far as Nundigram and on 27 January killed 11 and carried off three persons. The following morning they attacked a rear-guard of eight men, 4th Native Infantry, soon after they had left Nundigram; these fought most gallantly, only one man escaping. The Lushais lost 25 men on this occasion. On 23 February the Jhalnacherra tea garden was attacked by a party who killed and wounded seven coolies. Meanwhile, the Hill Tipperah and the Chittagong Hill Tracts also suffered, though not so severely.

Expedition
The Government of India now decided that an expedition should be made into the Lushai country during the ensuing cold weather. It was decided that the force should consist two columns, the right advancing from Chittagong and the left from Cachar. General Brownlow, C.B., commanded the former, with Captain Lewin, Superintendent of the Chittagong Hill Tracts, as Civil Officer, and General Bourchier, C.B., with Mr. Edgar, Deputy Commissioner, Cachar, as Civil Officer, was in charge of the left or Cachar column.

In addition to these two columns, a contingent of Meiteis accompanied by Colonel James Nuttall, the Political Agent of Manipur, made a demonstration across the southern border to co-operate with General Bourchier's portion of the expedition.

The entire political and military conduct of the expedition was placed in the hands of the Military Commanders, who were specially instructed that the object of the expedition was not one of pure retaliation, but that the surrender of the British subjects held in captivity should be insisted on, and that every endeavour should be made to establish friendly relations with the savage tribes and to convince them that they had nothing to gain and everything to lose by placing themselves in a hostile position towards the British Government.

The Cachar column, which consisted of half a battery of Artillery, a company of Sappers, and 500 rifles, started on 15 December 1871. After encountering and overcoming considerable resistance and penetrating a very difficult country, General Bourchier destroyed the chief village of the offending tribes and imposed conditions of peace. Hostages were taken and a fine of arms and produce was levied. The column reached Cachar on its return on 10 March 1872.

The Chittagong column of about the same force as that starting from Cachar advanced from Demagiri to deal with the Lyloos and Howlongs. Punishment was inflicted on these tribes and their full submission on suitable terms was secured. The restoration of all captives and an engagement to keep the peace in future were among the conditions on which the submission of the tribes was accepted. At the close of the expedition frontier posts were built to protect the border and bazaars were opened to encourage the Lushais to trade.

Aftermath
Assam now enjoyed comparative peace until 1888-1889, when the hillmen raided into Chittagong, and Assam furnished a force of 400 police under the command of Mr. Daly to co-operate with General Tregear's column. Entering the hills from Cachar, the police, with a detached force of the Chittagong column, attacked and destroyed several villages which were implicated in the raids into Chittagong in 1888. When the troops retired at the close of the operations, they left two posts in the North Lushai hills—one at Aijal, the other at Changsil—and a Political Officer was appointed to administer the North Lushai Tract, with headquarters at Aijal. In 1891, another British column was murdered, leading to the Chin-Lushai Expedition of 1889-90.

Notes

References

Attribution
. A note on page 16 states that: "This account is condensed from Mackenzie's North-Eastern Frontier of Bengal, pages 313–316."

Further reading

History of Assam
Military history of British India
1870s in British India
1871 in India
1872 in India
Conflicts in 1871
Conflicts in 1872
Punitive expeditions of the United Kingdom
History of Mizoram